Adiel Amorai (born 17 February 1934) is a former Israeli politician who served as a member of the Knesset for the Alignment between 1969 and 1988.

Biography
Born in Rehovot during the Mandate era, Amorai was educated at Municipal High School A in Tel Aviv, before studying economics, international relations and public administration at the Hebrew University of Jerusalem. He later worked as director of the Ministry of the Interior and as its spokesman.

In 1969 he was elected to the Knesset on the Alignment list. He was re-elected in 1973, 1977, 1981 and 1984, and on 24 September 1984 was appointed Deputy Minister of Finance. He resigned from the Knesset on 31 October 1988, and was replaced by Uri Sebag.

References

External links
 

1934 births
People from Rehovot
Jews in Mandatory Palestine
Hebrew University of Jerusalem Faculty of Social Sciences alumni
Israeli civil servants
Living people
Alignment (Israel) politicians
Members of the 7th Knesset (1969–1974)
Members of the 8th Knesset (1974–1977)
Members of the 9th Knesset (1977–1981)
Members of the 10th Knesset (1981–1984)
Members of the 11th Knesset (1984–1988)
Deputy ministers of Israel